Quercus bella is an uncommon species of oak tree. It has been found only in Yunnan Province in southern China.  It is placed in subgenus Cerris, section Cyclobalanopsis.

Quercus bella is a tree up to 30 meters tall, with leaves as much as 15 cm long.

References

External links
line drawings, Flora of China Illustrations vol. 4, fig. 386, drawings 1-4 at right

bella
Endemic flora of Yunnan
Trees of China
Plants described in 1979